The Hager–Mead House is a historic house at 411 Main Street in Waltham, Massachusetts.  The -story wood-frame house was built in 1795, and is one of the city's small number of 18th-century houses.   It is five bays wide and two deep, with chimneys set in the ridge, and a center entry flanked by Doric pilasters and topped by a six-pane transom window and modillioned cornice.  The house was built by Samuel Hager, a farmer from Watertown, who promptly sold it Stephen Mead, a blacksmith, in 1796.

The house was listed on the National Register of Historic Places in 1989.

See also
National Register of Historic Places listings in Waltham, Massachusetts

References

Houses on the National Register of Historic Places in Waltham, Massachusetts
Georgian architecture in Massachusetts
Houses completed in 1795
Houses in Waltham, Massachusetts